Khan Abdul Ghani Khan  (– 15 March 1996) was a Pashtun philosopher, poet, artist, writer and politician. He was a son of Abdul Ghaffar Khan, a prominent British Raj-era Indian independence activist. Throughout his life as a poet in both British India and Pakistan, Khan was known by the titles Lewanay Pālsapay and Da īlam Samander.

Life 
Khan was born in Hashtnagar, in the Frontier Tribal Areas of British India—roughly located in the modern-day village of Utmanzai in Charsadda District, Khyber Pakhtunkhwa, Pakistan. He was a son of Abdul Ghaffar Khan, a prominent Indian independence activist, and was the elder brother of Abdul Wali Khan. Khan's wife, Roshan, was from a Parsi family and was the daughter of Nawab Rustam Jang a prince of Hyderabad.  He went to study at the art academy at Rabindranath Tagore's University in Shantiniketan, where he developed a liking for painting and sculpture. He visited England and studied sugar technology in the United States, after which he returned to British India and started working at the Takht Bhai Sugar Mills in Takht Bhai in 1933. Largely owing to his father's influence, Khan was also involved in politics, supporting the cause of the Pashtuns of British India. Due to his activism, Khan was arrested by the Government of Pakistan in 1948—although he had given up politics by then—and remained in prison till 1954, in various jails all over the country. It was during these years that he wrote his poem collection, Da Panjray Chaghaar, which he considered to be the best work of his life. His contribution to literature (often unpublished) was ignored by the Pakistani government for much of his life; although near the end of his life, his works did receive much praise and as well as an award—for his contributions to Pashto literature and painting, the then-President of Pakistan, Muhammad Zia-ul-Haq, conferred on him the Sitara-i-Imtiaz on 23 March 1980.

Political Life and Imprisonment 

During a part of Ghani Khan's life, modern-day Pakistan did not exist. India was under British rule (hence called British India) and was fighting for its independence from the British. On 15 August 1947, India finally gained its independence. And a day before, on 14 August 1947, Pakistan had been born, becoming independent of British India. Hence, before all this independence, the Pashtuns who are now in Pakistan were under the rule of British India before the partition of India and Pakistan. This is where and why Bacha Khan's work was significant.

As for Ghani Khan, he was initially influenced by his father's political struggles and thus worked for the independence of the Pashtuns ruled by British India. However, he later came to disagree with his father's ideologies. He says, in an interview, that he left his father's political movement of non-violence, called "Khudai Khidmatgar" ("God’s Soldiers") because of some of the movement's motives that he disagreed with.

Although he was no longer involved in politics by the time of Pakistan's independence (1947), the government of Pakistan imprisoned him several times, sending him to jails from all over the country. His father spent close to half of his lifetime in jail (44 years out of his 99 years). Ghani Khan used his time in jail to write poetry; his main work in jail is called Da Panjrey Chaghar ("The Chirping of the Cage").

Works 

Aside from a few poems of his youth and early manhood, Ghani Khan's poetry, like his temperament, is anti-political. His poem collections include Panoos, Palwashay, De Panjray Chaghar, Kullyat and Latoon. He also wrote in English; his first book was The Pathans (1947). His only published work in Urdu was his book titled Khan Sahib (1994).

The singular distinction of his poetry – aside from his obvious poetic genius – is a profound blend of knowledge about his native and foreign cultures, and the psychological, sensual, and religious aspects of life.

A translation (Pashto to English) of selected 141 poems of Ghani Khan, called The Pilgrim of Beauty, has been authored by Imtiaz Ahmad Sahibzada, a friend and admirer of the poet. The book was printed in 2014 in Islamabad, Pakistan. It is a joint initiative by individual donors in Pakistan and the Aga Khan Trust for Culture, Afghanistan. The book also contains paintings of Ghani Khan. The Pakistan launch of the book took place in the Afghanistan-Pakistan Pukhtun Festival, in March 2015. The Afghanistan launch took place on 22 February 2016 by the Ministry of Information and Culture.In 1982, At Edwards College Peshawar, Quaid Muhammad Khan(President Of Pushto Literature) familiarized Ghani Khan with Sardar Ali Takkar so that he could be able to read Ghani Khan ghazals with some music at the background (Modern Day Tappy).

Quotes and prose 
Ghani Khan's love for nature and the local habitat of the Pashtun people is visible in his work.  He wrote

 "Pashtun is not merely a race but, in fact, a state of mind; there is a Pashtun lying inside every man, who at times wakes up and overpowers him."
 "The Pashtuns are rain-sown wheat: they all came up on the same day; they are all the same. But the chief reason why I love a Pashtun is that he will wash his face and oil his beard and perfume his locks and put on his best pair of clothes when he goes out to fight and die."
As a progressive and intellectual writer, he wrote, "I want to see my people educated and enlightened. A people with a vision and a strong sense of justice, who can carve out a future for themselves in harmony with nature."

Ghani khan poetry

څوک دې ماته وُوائي
څه رنګې شیدا شي څوک؟

څوک چې چاته وُخاندي
ولې پۀ خندا شي څوک؟

ستوري د غره څوکې تۀ
غلي شان بېګا وُوې

مینې پۀ ژړا وُوې
حسن پۀ خندا وُوې

Tribute 
Abdul Ghani Khan died on 15 March 1996 and was buried in Utmanzai, Charsadda.
The site is a historical mound very near his home, Dar- ul-Aman, and within the confines of his ancestral village, Utmanzai, on the main highway from Razzar to Takht-i-Bhai.

See also 
 Abdul Ali Khan
 Khan Abdul Bahram Khan
 Abdul Ghaffar Khan
 Abdul Wali Khan
 Family of Bahram Khan
 Utmanzai (Sarbani tribe)

References

Sources 
Mohammad Arif Khattak: Ghani Khan – A Poet of Social Reality,

External links 

Ghani Khan – interviews, images, and poems
Harappa – Audio and video interviews

Ghani Khan – Poetry
Life & Works of Ghani Khan
Interview of Author of The Pilgrim of Beauty – an English translation of Ghani Khan's 141 poems, by Deewa radio, Voice of America

1910s births
1996 deaths
Pashtun people
Pashtun nationalists
Pashto-language poets
Pakistani poets
Recipients of Sitara-i-Imtiaz
Ghani
People from British India
20th-century poets